Jöran Hägglund  (born 29 July 1959) is a Swedish politician. He is a member of the Centre Party. Hägglund was State Secretary of Sweden at the Ministry of Enterprise, Energy and Communications. Since 1 April 2014 he is the Governor of the County Administrative Board of Jämtland County.

References

Centre Party (Sweden) politicians
1959 births
Living people